Events in the year 1940 in Brazil.

Incumbents

Federal government
President: Getúlio Vargas

Governors 
 Alagoas: Osman Laurel (till 31 October); José Maria Correia das Neves (from 31 October)
 Amazonas: Álvaro Botelho Maia
 Bahia: Landulfo Alves
 Ceará: Francisco de Meneses Pimentel
 Espírito Santo: João Punaro Bley
 Goiás: Pedro Ludovico Teixeira
 Maranhão:
 Mato Grosso: Júlio Strübing Müller
 Minas Gerais: Benedito Valadares Ribeiro
 Pará: José Carneiro da Gama Malcher
 Paraíba: 
 till 29 July: Argemiro de Figueiredo 
 29 July-16 August: Antônio Galdino Guedes
 starting 16 August: Rui Carneiro
 Paraná: Manuel Ribas
 Pernambuco: Agamenon Magalhães
 Piauí: Leônidas Melo 
 Rio Grande do Norte: Rafael Fernandes Gurjão 
 Rio Grande do Sul: Osvaldo Cordeiro de Farias
 Santa Catarina: Nereu Ramos
 São Paulo: Ademar de Barros
 Sergipe: Erônides de Carvalho

Vice governors 
 Rio Grande do Norte: no vice governor
 São Paulo: no vice governor

Events
27 April - The Estádio do Pacaembu is inaugurated, at a ceremony attended by President Getúlio Vargas.
date unknown - The minority Baenan language becomes extinct.

Arts and culture

Films
Argila, directed by Humberto Mauro

Births
15 May - Oscar Castro-Neves, guitarist, arranger, and composer (died 2013)
19 May - Carlos Diegues, film director
23 June - Sérgio Reis, singer and actor
21 July - Marco Maciel, politician (died 2021)
23 September - Michel Temer, politician
21 or 23 October - Pelé, footballer
16 December - Adelaide Neri, teacher and politician.

Deaths
29 January - Pedro de Alcântara, Prince of Grão-Pará, born second-in-line to the Imperial throne of Brazil (born 1875)
8 November - Evandro Chagas, physician and biomedical scientist (born 1905; air crash)
date unknown - Manuel F. Araujo, actor (born 1880)

References

See also 
1940 in Brazilian football
List of Brazilian films of 1940

 
1940s in Brazil
Years of the 20th century in Brazil
Brazil
Brazil